The 1982–83 Gonzaga Bulldogs men's basketball team represented Gonzaga University in the West Coast Athletic Conference (WCAC) during the 1982–83 NCAA Division I men's basketball season. Led by second-year head coach Jay Hillock, the Bulldogs were  overall  and played their home games on campus at Kennedy Pavilion in Spokane, Washington.

Point guard John Stockton was a junior this season; he and junior guard Bryce McPhee were named to the all-conference team.

References

External links
Sports Reference – Gonzaga Bulldogs men's basketball – 1982-83 season

Gonzaga Bulldogs men's basketball seasons
Gonzaga
1982 in sports in Washington (state)
1983 in sports in Washington (state)